The 1937 Copa dos Campeões Estaduais was an official tournament organized by the now defunct Brazilian Football Federation (FBF), and aimed to point the Brazilian champion at that time. It was the second time a state champions cup happened in Brazil.

The competition brought together the 1936 champions of the state leagues of Rio de Janeiro, São Paulo, Campeonato Mineiro and Campeonato Capixaba, and was played in round-robin for points systems. The winning team was the Clube Atlético Mineiro.

Competition 
The 1936 tournament was organised by the Brazilian Football Federation Januar 1937 and held in a league format ("round robin") with home and away legs. Participants were the five state champions of 1936 and a delegation of the sports club of the navy, which qualified through an internal process. Participating teams were:

 the State Champions of Rio de Janeiro (Federal District): Fluminense FC from Rio de Janeiro
 the State Champions of São Paulo: Associação Portuguesa de Desportos from São Paulo
 the State Champions of Minas Gerais: Clube Atlético Mineiro from Belo Horizonte
 the State Champions of Espirito Santo: Rio Branco AC from Vitória
 the State Champions the State of Rio de Janeiro: Sport Club Alliança from Campos dos Goytacazes
 and Liga de Sports da Marinha, the sports club of the navy, coached by the renowned Nicolas Ladany, based in Rio de Janeiro

Atlético, Fluminense and Portuguesa were automatically qualified. The other participants played for one more place:

Qualification

The Matches

Final table

Winner was Atlético with the following team: Kafunga, Clóvis – Florindo, Quim – Zezé Procópio, Lola, Bala, Alcindo – Paulista, Abraz, Alfredo Bernardino, Bazzoni, Guará, Nicola, Resende, Elair – Coach: Floriano Peixoto Corrêa. Atlético usually played in a 2–3–5 formation.

References

1937 in Brazilian football